Neale Monks (born 1971) is a former palaeontologist at the Natural History Museum in London, where he worked primarily on heteromorph ammonites. He now writes about tropical fish and Macintosh computers.

References

Alumni of the University of Aberdeen
British palaeontologists
Living people
1971 births
Teuthologists
Fishkeeping